KS ROW 1964 Rybnik is a Polish association football club based in Rybnik. The club was formed in 2003 on the basis of RKS Energetyk Rybnik (founded in 1981) and traces its roots back to ROW Rybnik's football section, which was founded in 1964, and dissolved in the early 1990s. The club was called Energetyk ROW Rybnik between 2003 and 2015.

While KS ROW spent 7 seasons in the Ekstraklasa (1968–69, 1970–71, 1972–77), were runners-up of 1974–75 Polish Cup and played in the Intertoto Cup (1971, 1973, 1975, 1976), Energetyk ROW's biggest success to date has been the promotion to 2013–14 I Liga, the second tier in Polish league pyramid.

Before the 2015-2016 season after a fan vote and a board change, the club returned its historical roots and renamed itself "KS ROW 1964", dropping its affiliation with "Energetyk".

History
The history of football in Rybnik dates back to 1920, when a group of Polish activists, who participated in the Silesian Uprisings, formed a sports organisation in Rybnik. ROW itself was not formed until 1964, when two sports clubs, Górnik Rybnik and Górnik 23 Chwałowice, from nearby Chwałowice, merged. In its heyday (1970s), ROW Rybnik had 13 departments, including the most popular: football and speedway.

ROW Rybnik was officially created on August 6, 1964, upon the decision of local authorities. Its first manager was an influential coal magnate from Upper Silesia and chairman of Rybnik Union of Coal Industry, Jerzy Kucharczyk. ROW originally had 13 departments, including ski-jumping. Each department was financially supported by a different factory: ROW’s football team was sponsored by the Chwałowice Coal Mine.

In the 1966/67 season of Upper Silesian Third Division, ROW emerged as a winner, and was promoted to the 2nd division. In the summer of 1968, ROW won promotion to the Ekstraklasa, finishing below Zagłębie Wałbrzych, but ahead of Zawisza Bydgoszcz and Lech Poznań. After one year, the team was relegated, to once again win promotion to the first level of Polish football, after the 1969–70 season. Once again, ROW was relegated in the summer of 1971, to return to the Ekstraklasa in mid-1972 and remain there for five years.

In the 1974–75 season, ROW managed to reach the final of the Polish Cup, beating Metal Kluczbork, Legia Warsaw, Polonia Bytom, Lech Poznań and Górnik Zabrze in the semifinal. Final game, versus Stal Rzeszów, ended in a draw, and after penalty shootout, Stal won the Polish Cup.

ROW was relegated from the Ekstraklasa after the 1976–77 season, never to return to the top division. After several years in the Second Division, the team was in 1983 relegated to the Third Division.

In the early 1990s, ROWs football team was dissolved. Among top players, who put on ROW’s jersey were Henryk Wieczorek, Piotr Mowlik, and Eugeniusz Lerch. Altogether, ROW played seven years in Ekstraklasa: 198 games, 50 victories, 65 draws, 83 losses, 165 goals scored. It played in the Intertoto Cup four times.

The football section was re-founded in 2003 on the basis of Energetyk Rybnik, a small local team, and was subsequently renamed Energetyk ROW Rybnik, and although continuing the traditions of the original club, is considered a new entity. Energetyk ROW's biggest success to date has been the promotion to 2013–14 I Liga, the second tier in Polish league pyramid.

Before the 2015-2016 season after a fan vote and a board change, the club returned its historical roots and renamed itself "KS ROW 1964", dropping its affiliation with "Energetyk".

Honours
Polish Cup:
Runners-up (1): 1974–75

European record

Current squad 
As of 26 September 2021

References

External links 
 
 Former official website
 Unofficial supporter-run website

Association football clubs established in 1964
1964 establishments in Poland
2003 establishments in Poland
Football clubs in Silesian Voivodeship
Rybnik